The IDIC Epidemic is a science fiction novel by American writer Jean Lorrah, part of the Star Trek: The Original Series saga. The novel provides an explanation of why the Klingons seen in the original series have a very different appearance from the "Imperial" Klingons with huge forehead ridges seen later.

Plot
I.D.I.C. – Infinite Diversity in Infinite Combination. This is a philosophical cornerstone of the Vulcan society. Currently, a mysterious plague has hit the planet, a plague somehow tied into I.D.I.C and the fact hundreds of races also currently make their home on Vulcan as well. Unfortunately Vulcan is also a central part of Starfleet and the Federation as well, so if it falls, war might follow.

Continuity
The book features Daniel and T'Mir, a human/Vulcan couple from the author's previous novel, The Vulcan Academy Murders.

References

External links

Novels based on Star Trek: The Original Series
1988 American novels
American science fiction novels
Pocket Books books